TV Canaria 2 was an exclusive channel available on Digital Terrestrial Television (TDT) in the Canary Islands.

The channel was an autonomous television network owned by Televisión Canaria. TV Canaria 2 mainly broadcasts programmes such as documentary, cultural programmes and news programmes. The principal place of TV Canaria 2 is located in Santa Cruz de Tenerife.

External links
Official Site 

Mass media in the Canary Islands
Television channels and stations established in 2006
Spanish-language television stations
Companies of the Canary Islands